Offering is the third studio album by American indie pop band Cults, released by Sinderlyn on October 6, 2017.

Reception

Offering has received generally favorable reviews from several mainstream critic websites. At Metacritic, which assigns a normalized rating out of 100 to reviews from mainstream critics, the album has received an average score of 71 out of 100, which indicates "Generally Favorable Reviews," based on 9 reviews.

Track listing
Music and lyrics by Madeline Follin and Brian Oblivion

Personnel
Cults
Madeline Follin – vocals, production
Brian Oblivion – vocals, guitar, bass, keyboards, production

Charts

References

2017 albums
Cults (band) albums